Liván Taboada Diaz (born 4 October 1998) is a Cuban volleyball player, a member of the club Știința Explorări Baia Mare.

Sporting achievements

National Team 
Men's Junior Pan-American Cup:
  2017
FIVB Men's U21 World Championship:
  2017
FIVB Men's U23 World Championship:
  2017
Pan American Cup:
  2019, 2022
  2018
Men's U23 Pan-American Cup:
  2018
Pan American Games:
  2019

References

External links
 Volleybox profile
 Poland2014.FIVB profile

1998 births
Living people
Cuban men's volleyball players
Expatriate volleyball players in Romania
Cuban expatriates in Romania